M. C. Smith 1915-1916 
F. G. Ghent 1917
C. F. Coleman 1918
T. W. Peart 1919
M. C. Smith 1919
Hughes Cleaver 1920
J. J. Hobson 1921-1922 
E. A. Harris 1923-1924 
J. S. Allen 1925-1928 
E. Holtby 1929-1930 
L. D. Dingle 1931-1932 
J. W. Ryckman 1933
F. W. Watson 1934-1935 
G. R. Harris 1936-1939 
J. G. Blair 1940-1945 
E. R. Leather 1946-1947 
N. R. Craig 1948-1950 
E. W. Smith 1951-1956 
John A. Lockhart 1957-1961 
Owen F. Mullin 1962-1965 
Lloyd F. Berryman 1966-1967 
George Harrington 1968-1976 
Mary Munro 1977-1978 
Roly Bird 1979-1991 
Walter Mulkewich 1992-1997 
Rob MacIsaac 1998-2006
Cam Jackson 2006 - November 30, 2010
Rick Goldring December 1, 2010 - November 30, 2018
Marianne Meed Ward December 1, 2018 - Present

Burlington, Ontario